Te Te Rapa Nui (1996) is the first newspaper edited and published in Rapa Nui (Easter Island). It was founded by journalist Juan Pedro Soler Bolt, husband of the provincial governor, Melania Carolina Hotu Hey.

Newspapers published in Chile
Publications established in 1996
Easter Island
1996 establishments in Easter Island